Each winner of the 1994 Governor General's Awards for Literary Merit received $10 000 and a medal from the Governor General of Canada. The winners were selected by a panel of judges set up by the Canada Council for the Arts.

English Language

Fiction
Winner:
 Rudy Wiebe, A Discovery of Strangers

Other Finalists:
 Margaret Atwood, The Robber Bride
 Donna McFarlane, Division of Surgery
 Alice Munro, Open Secrets
 Russell Smith, How Insensitive

Poetry
Winner:
 Robert Hilles, Cantos from a Small Room

Other Finalists:
 Robin Blaser, The Holy Forest
 Polly Fleck, The Chinese Execution
 Monty Reid, Dog Sleeps

Drama
Winner:
 Morris Panych, The Ends of the Earth

Other Finalists:
 Joanna McClelland Glass, If We Are Women
 Wendy Lill, All Fall Down
 Bryden MacDonald, Whale Riding Weather

Non-Fiction
Winner:
 John A. Livingston, Rogue Primate: An Exploration of Human Domestication

Other Finalists:
 Sharon Butala, The Perfection of the Morning: An Apprenticeship in Nature
 Denise Chong, The Concubine's Children: Portrait of a Family
 Joan Haggerty, The Invitation: A Memoir of Family Love and Reconciliation
 Peter Larisey, Light for a Cold Land: Lawren Harris's Work and Life-An Interpretation

Children's Literature – Text
Winner:
 Julie Johnston, Adam and Eve and Pinch-Me (Lester Publishing)

Other Finalists:
 Sarah Ellis, Out of the Blue
 Carol Matas, The Burning Time
 Jim McGugan, Josepha: A Prairie Boy's Story
 Ken Roberts, Past Tense

Children's Literature – Illustration
Winner:
 Murray Kimber, Josepha: A Prairie Boy's Story

Other Finalists:
 Marie Lafrance, La Diablesse and the Baby
 Michèle Lemieux, There Was An Old Man...: A Collection of Limericks
 Laurie McGaw, Polar the Titanic Bear

Translation (from French to English)
Winner:
 Donald Winkler, The Lyric Generation: The Life and Times of the Baby Boomers

Other Finalists:
 Patricia Claxton, Tchipayuk or The Way of the Wolf
 Sheila Fischman, The Sound of Living Things
 David Homel, An Aroma of Coffee
 Shelley Tepperman, Playing Bare

French Language

Fiction
Winner:
 Robert Lalonde, Le petit aigle à tête blanche

Other Finalists:
 Réjean Ducharme, Va savoir
 Daniel Poliquin, L'Écureuil noir
 Hélène Rioux, Pense à mon rendez-vous
 Sylvain Trudel, Les Prophètes

Poetry
Winner:
 Fulvio Caccia, Aknos

Other Finalists:
 Marcel Labine, Machines imaginaires
 Rachel Leclerc, Rabatteurs d'étoiles
 Paul Chanel Malenfant, Hommes de profil
 Pierre Ouellet, Vita chiara, villa oscura

Drama
Winner:
 Michel Ouellette, French Town

Other Finalists:
 Michelle Allen, Morgane
 Yvan Bienvenue, Histoires à mourir d'amour
 Claude Poissant, Si tu meurs, je te tue
 Jean-Pierre Ronfard, Cinq études

Non-Fiction
Winner:
 Chantal Saint-Jarre, Du sida

Other Finalists:
 Fernand Dumont, Genèse de la société québécoise
 Jean Lamarre, Le devenir de la nation québécoise
 Ginette Pelland, La peur des mots
 Georges E. Sioui, Les Wendats : une civilisation méconnue

Children's Literature – Text
Winner:
 Suzanne Martel, Une belle journée pour mourir

Other Finalists:
 Marie-Danielle Croteau, Un monde à la dérive
 François Gravel, Klonk

Children's Literature – Illustration
Winner:
 Pierre Pratt, Mon chien est un éléphant

Other Finalists:
 Sylvie Deronzier, Tartarin et le lion
 Stéphane Poulin, Le parc aux sortilèges
 Rémy Simard, Monsieur noir et blanc
 Gilles Tibo, Simon et la plume perdue

Translation (from English to French)
Winner:
 Jude Des Chênes, Le mythe du sauvage

Other Finalists:
 Claire Dupond and Hervé Juste, Les spécialistes des sciences sociales et la politique au Canada
 Michèle Marineau, Au-delà des ténèbres
 Normand Paiement and Hervé Juste, Les Géants des ordures
 Daniel Poliquin, Le récit de voyage en Nouvelle – France de l'abbé peintre Hugues Pommier

Governor General's Awards
Governor General's Awards
Governor General's Awards